Martín Sánchez (May 3, 1979 in Mexico City – July 2, 2005 in Clark County, Nevada), aka The Fireman (Bombero in Spanish), was a Mexican super featherweight boxer. He died of the injuries sustained in a boxing fight at the Orleans Hotel and Casino in Clark County, Nevada.

Sánchez died following his 9th round knockout loss to Rustam Nugaev. Sánchez had left the ring under his own power after being examined by the ringside doctor. He was also examined in his dressing room by a second doctor. Later, after a commission inspector noticed Sánchez walking strangely, he was examined again and rushed to a local hospital where he underwent emergency surgery for a subdural hematoma. He was placed on a ventilator, but died the following morning.

External links

References

1979 births
2005 deaths
Boxers from Mexico City
Super-featherweight boxers
Deaths due to injuries sustained in boxing
Sports deaths in Nevada
Mexican male boxers